Borceguí Island is an ice-free island in the South Shetland Islands, midway between Cape Yelcho and the Gibbous Rocks,  off the north coast of Elephant Island. The name was applied by the command of the Argentine sea-going tug Chiriguano in the 1954–55 cruise; in Spanish "borceguí" means half-boot and describes the shape of the island.

See also 
 List of antarctic and sub-antarctic islands

References 

Islands of the South Shetland Islands